Sally Podger is a retired female badminton player from England.

Badminton career
Podger represented England and won a gold medal in the team event, a silver medal in the singles and a bronze medal in the doubles, at the 1982 Commonwealth Games in Brisbane, Queensland, Australia.

References

English female badminton players
1962 births
Living people
Commonwealth Games medallists in badminton
Commonwealth Games gold medallists for England
Commonwealth Games silver medallists for England
Commonwealth Games bronze medallists for England
Badminton players at the 1982 Commonwealth Games
Medallists at the 1982 Commonwealth Games